The 2013–14 Scottish League Championship, or 2013–14 RBS Scottish League Championship for sponsorship reasons, was the 40th season of formal domestic rugby union leagues in Scotland.

The season was contested between August 2013 and March 2014 with Melrose RFC overhauling Gala RFC to win the Championship on a dramatic final day of the season.

Premier Division

National League

Premier Division / National League play-off

Championship

Championship A

Championship B

Rugby in Scotland